() is an anime series (1981) that updates the Greek mythology of Odysseus (known as "Ulixes" or "Ulysses" in Latin) to the 31st century. The show comprises 26 half-hour episodes as a co-production between DIC Audiovisuel and TMS Entertainment.

Plot

The series (made by the French Jean Chalopin) follows the struggles of Ulysses and his crew against the divine entities that rule the universe, the ancient gods from Greek mythology. The Gods of Olympus are angered when Ulysses, commander of the giant spaceship Odyssey, kills the giant Cyclops to save a group of enslaved children, including his son. Zeus sentences Ulysses to travel the universe with his crew frozen until he finds the Kingdom of Hades, at which point his crew will be revived and he will be able to return to Earth. Along the way they encounter numerous other famous figures from Greek mythology who have been given a futuristic twist.

Main characters 
  is the main character and captain of the Odyssey. He achieved the solar peace and became the target of the Olympian gods' revenge. His weapon is a laser pistol that conceals an energy blade, complemented by an energy shield and a belt that allows him to fly. Ulysses is brave, noble, determined, and will stop at nothing to defeat the gods.
  is the son of Ulysses and second in command for most of the voyage. He is Yumi's friend and protector. He is a skilled pilot, and his weapon is a high-tech slingshot.
  is Thémis in the original French dub (after Themis the ancient Titan). A blue-skinned humanoid alien girl from the white planet, Zotra, she is the younger sister of Numinor and possesses telepathic powers. She is saved from being sacrificed to the Cyclops, along with Telemachus and her older brother, by Ulysses. She exhibits telekinesis and is immune to fire. Although physically very frail, she is very intelligent and courageous. Zotrians, aside from blue skin, have snow-white hair, pointed ears, and slanted eyes with cat-like vertical pupils.
  is Noumaïos in the original French dub. A Zotrian teenager and older brother of Yumi, he is saved by Ulysses from being sacrificed to the Cyclops. He is in suspended animation along with the rest of the crew for most of the series. His Japanese name Yumaiosu is the katakana orthography of English pronunciation of Eumaeus, the pig-guardian of Odysseus in Homer's poem.
  is the small robotic companion of Telemachus. Fond of eating nuts and nails, he is a trusty friend who was given to Telemachus as a birthday present. He is skilled at machinery repair and possesses tremendous physical strength.
  is the Odysseys main computer, with a deep female voice.
  is the god of gods, persecutor of Ulysses.
  is the god of the Seas, enraged by Ulysses's killing of his creature, the Cyclops. He wields a trident, the symbol of his power, and his servants pilot ships that are shaped like a trident.
  is the ruling god of the Underworld. Ulysses must find his realm to find the way back to Earth.

Episodes

Pilot 
In 1980, Telecom Animation, TMS Entertainment, and DiC Audiovisuel produced a pilot for the series, simply titled "Ulysses 31". Although there was a Japanese VHS release of the series by King Records in 1986, the pilot never saw an official home release and was used for internal use only.

The pilot has long been considered as only been recorded in Japanese, until a French searcher discovered a copy of the French version in July 2015, then a copy of the English-dubbed version in June 2022.

The story is virtually identical to episode one of the finished series; however, the story was the only thing that was kept. Some characters underwent major redesigns from a typical anime design to the finished series, which is a mix of Japanese anime style and European art based on the appearance of classical Greek sculpture. Renowned Japanese illustrators and animators Shingo Araki and Michi Himeno, who have worked in anime adaptations of famous manga (such as Masami Kurumada's Saint Seiya, Fūma no Kojirō, Ring ni Kakero, Riyoko Ikeda's Versailles no Bara, and UFO Grendizer OVA) were responsible for the finished series' character designs, animation routines, and visual style.

Soundtrack 
Most of the original soundtrack was composed by Denny Crockett and Ike Egan. Six additional themes were composed by Shuki Levy and Haim Saban: "Potpourri", "Final Glory", "Space Traffic", "Ulysse Meets Ulysse", "Mermaids", and "Change of Time (Theme of Chronos)".

The Japanese version has a different soundtrack. The music was composed by Wakakusa Kei, who made the soundtrack in both the series and pilot that was produced in 1980. An official soundtrack was released in 1986 on vinyl and on CD in 1988 by King Records.

Japanese theme songs 
 Opening
  by Tomoaki Taka
 Ending
  by Tomoaki Taka

Cast
 Japan (original cast)
 Ulysses: Osamu Kobayashi
 Telemachus: Yū Mizushima
 Yumi: Sumi Shimamoto
 Nono: Mayumi Tanaka
 Zeus: Shouzou Hirabayashi
 Japan (1992 NHK BS-2 cast)
 Ulysses: Masane Tsukayama
 Telemachus: Nobuo Tobita
 Yumi: Akiko Yajima
 Nono: Miki Narahashi
 Zeus: Shouzou Hirabayashi
 France (original cast)
 Ulysses: Claude Giraud
 Yumi: Séverine Morisot
 Telemachus: Fabrice Josso / Jackie Berger
 Nono: Jacques Ebner
 Shyrka: Évelyne Séléna / Sylvie Moreau
 Zeus: Jean Topart
 English (original cast)
 Ulysses: Matt Birman
 Yumi: Anick Faris
 Telemachus: Adrian Knight
 Nono: Howard Ryshpan
 Shyrka: Kelly Ricard
 Zeus: Vlasta Vrána

Release
In the United States, the show was broadcast as a half-hour segment in the 1986 anthology series Kideo TV. The entire series was released in English in a complete DVD box set in the UK released by Contender Entertainment, and in Australia by Madman Entertainment. In the United States, one DVD titled Ulysses 31: The Mysteries of Time was released, containing only four selected episodes. The rights, like most of DIC's other programs, are owned by WildBrain, through its in-name-only unit, Cookie Jar Entertainment.

References

Further reading 
 Dixième Planète (French magazine) Issue No. 15 (Feb/Mar 2002), 8 pages about the series and toys produced

External links 

 
 TMS official website

1981 anime television series debuts
1981 French television series debuts
1982 French television series endings
1980s French animated television series
1980s science fiction television series
Adventure anime and manga
First-run syndicated television programs in the United States
French children's animated action television series
French children's animated space adventure television series
French children's animated drama television series
French children's animated science fantasy television series
Japanese children's animated action television series
Japanese children's animated science fantasy television series
Television series based on classical mythology
Classical mythology in anime and manga
Kideo TV
Science fiction anime and manga
Television series by DIC Entertainment
Modern adaptations of the Odyssey
Television shows based on the Odyssey
TMS Entertainment
Television series set in ancient Greece
Television series created by Jean Chalopin